Cain is a 1918 German silent drama film directed by Bruno Rahn and Walter Schmidthässler and produced by Max Maschke. In the starring roles were Erich Kaiser-Titz, Olga Engl and Reinhold Schünzel. It was released in two separate parts Das Verhängnis auf Schloß Santarem and Im Goldrausch.

Cast

References

Bibliography

External links

1918 films
Films of the German Empire
German silent feature films
German drama films
1918 drama films
German black-and-white films
Silent drama films
1910s German films